The Kilbourn Masonic Temple is a historic Masonic building located in Milwaukee, Wisconsin. It was constructed in 1911 as a meeting hall for Kilbourn Lodge #3, a local Masonic lodge which was one of the first three organized in Wisconsin in 1843.  The Masons no longer meet in the building). It was listed on the National Register of Historic Places in 1986. When it celebrated its 100th anniversary in 2011, the temple was automatically deemed a landmark in the city of Milwaukee. The temple used to serve as a fraternity house for the Kappa Sigma chapter at Marquette University but is now rented as living space for residents/students.

The building was originally a residence but it was remodeled by the masons with a Classical Revival facade which completely enclosed the former house.  The renovation was designed by architect  H. Paul Schnetzky and Son in 1911.

References

Clubhouses on the National Register of Historic Places in Wisconsin
Neoclassical architecture in Wisconsin
Masonic buildings completed in 1911
Buildings and structures in Milwaukee
Former Masonic buildings in Wisconsin
National Register of Historic Places in Milwaukee